A Rustling of Leaves: Inside the Philippine Revolution is a Canadian documentary film, directed by Nettie Wild and released in 1988. The film is a portrait of the political upheaval in the Philippines in the 1980s, including the People Power Revolution which ended the presidency of Ferdinand Marcos and the country's uneasy transition toward democracy under his successor Corazon Aquino.

The film had its roots when Wild travelled to the Philippines as part of a theatre exchange program in 1985, when the group she was workshopping a play with was shelled by government forces. Wild pledged to return to the Philippines as soon as possible to make a documentary film about the campaign to oust Marcos, only to have the People Power Revolution take place before she could get back and thus changing the film's intended focus to include figures that supported the government as well, including an interview with Aquino herself.

The film was partially funded by the United Kingdom's Channel 4, alongside contributions from the National Film Board of Canada, Telefilm Canada, B.C. Film and the Canada Council. Following his death in 2013, editor Peter Wintonick was credited by Wild as having had an important role in making the film what it was, as she had over 64,000 feet of film to sort through and it was Wintonick's influence that helped her focus on shaping the film.

The film premiered at the 1988 Vancouver International Film Festival.

Awards
The film received a Genie Award nomination for Best Feature Length Documentary at the 10th Genie Awards in 1989.

The film was screened in the Forum for Young Cinema program at the 1989 Berlin Film Festival, where it received an honorable mention from the Peace Film Award jury and won the Zitty audience award. In June 1989 it was screened as part of the National Film Board's special 50th-anniversary Salute to the Documentary festival in Montreal, where it was awarded the Public Prize as the most popular film in the program.

Kirk Tougas won the Canadian Society of Cinematographers award for Best Cinematography in Documentary in 1990.

References

External links
 

1988 films
1988 documentary films
Canadian documentary films
Films shot in the Philippines
1980s English-language films
Films directed by Nettie Wild
1980s Canadian films